The Kevin Islands are a cluster of small islands and rocks which lie close to the northern coast of Trinity Peninsula, Antarctica, midway between Halpern Point and Coupvent Point. They were named by the Advisory Committee on Antarctic Names for Kevin M. Scott, a member of a geological party from the University of Wisconsin (U.S. Antarctic Research Program), who carried out independent studies in Gerlache Strait, 1961–62.

See also 
List of Antarctic and sub-Antarctic islands

References

Islands of Trinity Peninsula